Mizotrechus is a genus of beetles in the family Carabidae, first described by Henry Walter Bates in 1872.

Species 
Mizotrechus contains the following eighteen species:

 Mizotrechus batesi Erwin, 2011
 Mizotrechus bellorum Erwin, 2011
 Mizotrechus belvedere Erwin, 2011
 Mizotrechus brulei Erwin, 2011
 Mizotrechus chontalesensis Erwin, 2011
 Mizotrechus costaricensis Erwin, 2011
 Mizotrechus dalensi Erwin, 2011
 Mizotrechus edithpiafae Erwin, 2011
 Mizotrechus fortunensis Erwin, 2011
 Mizotrechus gorgona Erwin, 2011
 Mizotrechus grossus Erwin, 2011
 Mizotrechus jefe Erwin, 2011
 Mizotrechus marielaforetae Erwin, 2011
 Mizotrechus minutus Erwin, 2011
 Mizotrechus neblinensis Erwin, 2011
 Mizotrechus novemstriatus Bates, 1872
 Mizotrechus poirieri Erwin, 2011
 Mizotrechus woldai Erwin, 2011

References

Lebiinae